Eduard Gimatov (born 22 January 1994) is a Russian professional ice hockey player. He is currently playing with Neftyanik Almetievsk of the Supreme Hockey League (VHL).

Gimatov made his Kontinental Hockey League (KHL) debut playing with Avtomobilist Yekaterinburg during the 2012–13 KHL season.

References

External links

1994 births
Living people
Avtomobilist Yekaterinburg players
HC Neftekhimik Nizhnekamsk players
Russian ice hockey forwards
Salavat Yulaev Ufa players
Severstal Cherepovets players
HC Spartak Moscow players
Sportspeople from Ufa
Tatar people of Russia
Tatar sportspeople
Toros Neftekamsk players
Universiade medalists in ice hockey
Universiade gold medalists for Russia
Competitors at the 2015 Winter Universiade